Shah Muhammad Abu Zafar is a Bangladesh Nationalist Party politician and a 3-term Jatiya Sangsad member representing the Faridpur-1 constituency.

Career
Zafar joined Bangladesh Nationalist Party in 2003 from Jatiya Party. He decided to contest the 30 August 2005 Faridpur-1 by election as an independent candidate after failing to get the Bangladesh Nationalist Party nomination. The by elections were called after Kazi Sirajul Islam, the Bangladesh Awami League member of Parliament, joined Bangladesh Nationalist Party. On 10 August 2005, Bangladesh Nationalist Party withdrew its nomination of Kazi Sirajul Islam and gave its nomination to Zafar. He won the by election and was sworn into office on 5 September 2005 by Speaker Jamiruddin Sarkar. He was nominated to contest the Faridpur-1 election by Bangladesh Nationalist Party.

References

Living people
Bangladesh Nationalist Party politicians
3rd Jatiya Sangsad members
4th Jatiya Sangsad members
8th Jatiya Sangsad members
Year of birth missing (living people)
Place of birth missing (living people)